is a puzzle video game developed and published by Nintendo in 1984 in Japan for the Famicom. It was released in North America in 1985 as a Nintendo Entertainment System launch game and in Europe in 1987. Nintendo has rereleased it many times via emulation.

Title 
Although "Clu Clu Land" is the official English title for the game, "Clu Clu" is actually an anglicization of "Kuru Kuru"; a Japanese onomatopoeia that refers to something going "around and around". In order for Bubbles to move around the mazes, she must grab onto poles with her hands. When she holds on to a pole without letting go, she spins "around and around". The same phrase is also the basis for the title of the Game Boy Advance game Kuru Kuru Kururin.

Gameplay

The story starts with a type of sea urchin, the Unira, stealing all of the treasures in the underwater kingdom of Clu Clu Land. Bubbles, the heroine, sets out to retrieve the treasure. The object of the game is to uncover all the gold ingots in each stage while avoiding the Unira and Black Holes. Ingots usually form a shape such as a heart or a mushroom. The only way Bubbles can turn around to change directions is by means of Turning Posts located throughout the stages. She can stun the Unira by using a Sound Wave. When they are stunned, she can push them into a wall to get rid of them and receive points. If Bubbles is hurt by the Unira, she will lose a life. A life is also lost if she falls into a Black Hole, or if time runs out. The game ends when Bubbles has lost all her lives.

In later levels, the player must pass over the ingots an odd number of times to uncover them, as they will alternate between their uncovered side and a dull side.

Ports
System. It contains twice as many puzzles, a new enemy named Boss Unira, different level themes, and other adjustments. A port of this version was released as the final game for the Family Computer Disk System (FDS), titled Clu Clu Land: Welcome to New Cluclu Land. It contains a few minor enhancements such as difficulty selection.

In September 2001, a port was released for the Sharp Zaurus series of PDAs.

Legacy 
Various elements from Clu Clu Land appear throughout the Super Smash Bros. series. Bubbles appears as a trophy in Super Smash Bros. Melee, and the Unira enemy appears as an item in the series beginning with Super Smash Bros. Brawl. A medley of various tracks from the original game is selectable as background music for a number of stages in several games in the series, and Bubbles and Unira are featured as Spirits in Ultimate. 

Bubbles appears as an unlockable playable character in DK: King of Swing, which features gameplay inspired by Clu Clu Land.
 
WarioWare: Smooth Moves and WarioWare: Twisted! include minigames based on Clu Clu Land.

Both the NES and FDS versions are unlockable in the GameCube game Animal Crossing, with the latter retitled Clu Clu Land D outside Japan. Clu Clu Land is included in the NES Remix series. It was released for the Nintendo Switch in the eShop on June 28, 2018, by Hamster Corporation as part of the Arcade Archives series.

See also 
 List of NES games

Notes

References

External links 

Clu Clu Land at NinDB

1984 video games
Arcade video games
Nintendo e-Reader games
Famicom Disk System games
Game Boy Advance games
Nintendo arcade games
Nintendo games
Nintendo Entertainment System games
Nintendo Research & Development 1 games
Nintendo Vs. Series games
Video games developed in Japan
Video games scored by Akito Nakatsuka
Virtual Console games
Virtual Console games for Wii U
Video games featuring female protagonists
Nintendo Switch games
Nintendo Switch Online games
Virtual Console games for Nintendo 3DS
Hamster Corporation games
Multiplayer and single-player video games